Manitou Lake may refer to several places:

Canada 

In Ontario
Lake Manitou on Manitoulin Island in Manitoulin District, Ontario
In Quebec
Lake Manitou (Lac-Jérôme), in Lac-Jérôme, Minganie RCM, on the Manitou river
Lake Manitou, Ivry-sur-le-Lac, MRC des Laurentides
In Saskatchewan
Little Manitou Lake (sometimes called Manitou Lake), near Watrous
Manitou Lake (Saskatchewan), south of Lloydminster
Rural Municipality of Manitou Lake No. 442, Saskatchewan

United States 

Lake Manitou (Indiana) in Rochester, Indiana
 Lake Manitou on North Manitou Island in Michigan

See also 

 Manitou (disambiguation)